Gates Mills Methodist Episcopal Church (also known as St. Christopher's-by-the-River) is a historic church on Old Mill Road off U.S. 322 in Gates Mills, Ohio.

It was built in 1853 and added to the National Register of Historic Places in 1975.

References

External links
 
 

Churches on the National Register of Historic Places in Ohio
Churches completed in 1853
19th-century Methodist church buildings in the United States
Churches in Cuyahoga County, Ohio
Methodist churches in Ohio
19th-century Methodist church buildings
National Register of Historic Places in Cuyahoga County, Ohio